Spiracme is a genus of crab spiders erected by Anton Menge in 1876 to contain S. striata, transferred from Xysticus. The exact relationship of these spiders and their closest relatives has been long debated, and many included species have been transferred to and from similar genera, namely Xysticus and Ozyptila. Most recently, Rainer Breitling conducted a DNA barcoding study in 2019 and grouped similar species based on the results:

Species

 it contains ten species:
S. baltistana (Caporiacco, 1935) – Kazakhstan, Russia (Central Asia to Far East), Central Asia, Mongolia, China
S. dura (Sørensen, 1898) – USA, Canada, Greenland
S. keyserlingi (Bryant, 1930) – USA, Canada
S. lehtineni (Fomichev, Marusik & Koponen, 2014) – Russia (South Siberia)
S. mongolica (Schenkel, 1963) – Slovakia, Serbia, Ukraine, Russia (Europe to Central Asia), Azerbaijan, Kazakhstan, Mongolia, China
S. nigromaculata (Keyserling, 1884) – USA, Canada
S. quadrata (Tang & Song, 1988) – China
S. striatipes (L. Koch, 1870) (type) – Europe, Turkey, Caucasus, Russia (Europe) to Central Asia, Iran, China
S. triangulosa (Emerton, 1894) – USA, Canada
S. vachoni (Schenkel, 1963) – Russia (Middle Siberia to Far East), Kazakhstan, Mongolia, Japan

See also
 Xysticus
 List of Thomisidae genera

References

Further reading

Thomisidae genera
Holarctic spiders